Reconquista is a city in the north of the ,  from the provincial capital.

The city lies on a branch of the Paraná River opposite the city of Goya, Corrientes. As of 2005, the construction of a road link between the two cities is under study; at present there is no way to cross the multiple minor branches, streams and wetlands except by boat.

Reconquista was founded on 27 April 1872 as a military fort, established by Colonel Manuel Obligado, in lands formerly belonging to the Jesuit mission Reducción San Jerónimo del Rey. It was declared a city in 1921.

Climate

Transportation
The city is served by commercial airlines using the Reconquista Airport, served, as of 2018, by Avianca.

History
Reconquista was natively inhabited by the Abipones people according to accounts from Jesuit Martin Dobrizhoffer.

On November 22, 1872, the Governor Simón de Iriondo by Decree No. 430 authorizing the creation of a town a with the name of Reconquista.

In 1998, there were a high number of leptospirosis cases were detected, coming from the area of Reconquista Central Hospital in Reconquista, Santa Fe province.

Notable residents
Gabriel Batistuta:  retired professional footballer
Laura Devetach, writer, was born here in 1936.
Juan Gómez Taleb: professional footballer
Candela Ferro - television journalist

References

 Municipalidad de Reconquista (official website)

External links
Reconquista, Santa Fe, Argentina. City information, Photos, Tourism... www.portalreconquista.com.ar

Populated places in Santa Fe Province
Paraná River
Cities in Argentina
Argentina
Santa Fe Province